The 179th Division was created in February 1949 under the Regulation of the Redesignations of All Organizations and Units of the Army, issued by Central Military Commission on November 1, 1948, basing on the 23rd Brigade, 8th Column of the Huabei Military Region Field Force. Its history could be traced to the 23rd Brigade of Taiyue Military District, activated in December 1945.

The division was part of 60th Corps. Under the flag of the 179th division, it took part in many major battles in the Chinese Civil War, including the Linfen Campaign, Jinzhong Campaign, Taiyuan Campaign, and Chengdu Campaign. The division (then brigade) became the first unit that breached into the city perimeter during the Linfen Campaign, and received the honorific title of Linfen Brigade() after that.

In March 1951, the division was deployed into Korea as a part of the People's Volunteer Army along with the 60th Corps. In September 1953, the division left Korea.

The division was then garrisoned in Bengbu, Anhui Province.

In November 1953, the 559th Artillery Regiment was activated and attached to the division.

From April 1960, the division was renamed as the 179th Army Division().  By then the division was composed of:
535th Regiment
536th Regiment
537th Regiment
559th Artillery Regiment

In January 1961, the division was defined as one of the first ten combat alert divisions.

In February 1961, the 283rd Tank Self-Propelled Artillery Regiment joined the division from the 181st Army Division.

From July 1962, the division maintained as a northern division, category A. 

From June to November 1962, the division was deployed to Fujian Province for counter-invasion operation against the ROC Army. The invasion did not happen and the 179th returned to its barracks in November.

On September 30, 1967, 283rd Tank Self-Propelled Artillery Regiment detached from the division to join the newly-activated 9th Tank Division.

In August 1969, 566th Artillery Regiment was renamed the Artillery Regiment, 179th Army Division.

In September 1985, the division was redesignated as the 179th Infantry Division() and reconstituted as a northern infantry division, category B.  The division was transferred to the 12th Army following 60th Army Corps' disbandment.

In 1989, 535th Regiment was reconstituted as the Special Security Regiment of the Nanjing Military Region.

In 1998 the division was reduced and reorganized as the 179th Motorized Infantry Brigade().

In April 2017, the brigade was reorganized as the 179th Light Combined Arms Brigade().

The brigade now stations in Nanjing, Jiangsu Province, as a maneuvering part of PLA 72nd Army.

References
中国人民解放军各步兵师沿革, http://blog.sina.com.cn/s/blog_a3f74a990101cp1q.html

Infantry divisions of the People's Volunteer Army
179
Military units and formations established in 1949